Félix Jacinto Prieto Partido (born 24 May 1975) is a Spanish former footballer who played as a forward.

Club career
Born in Salamanca, Region of León, Prieto played in Real Madrid's youth system, later appearing with the C-team at the same time of the likes of Álvaro Benito, Fernando Morán, Raúl or Víctor Sánchez. Upon leaving in 1995, he competed in the lower leagues.

Prieto's debut in the second division occurred in the 2001–02 season at the age of already 26, with Gimnàstic de Tarragona. He played 23 matches (only four starts, 649 minutes of action) and scored two goals, as the Catalans suffered relegation one year after promoting.

Prieto subsequently resumed his career in the third level, appearing in three promotion playoffs without succeeding, with Alicante CF – twice – and CD Alcoyano. Another of his teams, Ciudad de Murcia, promoted to division two in the 2002–03 campaign, but he had already left in mid-season to CF Reus Deportiu.

In 2009–10, 34-year-old Prieto contributed with eight goals in 29 appearances to help CF Atlético Ciudad finish seventh in the third division, only to be relegated due to financial irregularities. For the following season, he moved to the fourth level with CF La Nucía (sixth group).

References

External links

1975 births
Living people
Sportspeople from Salamanca
Spanish footballers
Footballers from Castile and León
Association football forwards
Segunda División players
Segunda División B players
Tercera División players
Real Madrid C footballers
UP Langreo footballers
Gimnàstic de Tarragona footballers
Ciudad de Murcia footballers
CF Reus Deportiu players
Novelda CF players
Alicante CF footballers
CD Alcoyano footballers
Villajoyosa CF footballers
20th-century Spanish people
21st-century Spanish people